Ibini is a surname. Notable people with the surname include:
Matilda Ibini, Nigerian-British playwright and screenwriter
Princess Ibini-Isei (born 2000), Australian football player
Bernie Ibini-Isei (born 1992), Australian soccer player

See also
Ibini Ukpabi, oracle